Spyros Kontoulis (1915 — 1944) was a Greek footballer who played as a midfielder.

Club career

Coming in 1935 from the local Amyna Kokkinia, Kotoulis moved to AEK Athens and managed to make 83 appearances and celebrate two championships, a Cup and an Athens championship. AEK had imposed itself on their opponents, it had won the last two championships and created in retrospect the question that it would have stopped if football activities were not inevitably interrupted, due to the invasion of Greece by Italy. Kontoulis interrupted his football career in order to fight in the war. He continued playing for AEK during The Occupation taking part in unofficial tournaments, until he was arrested and executed by Nazis in 1944.

International career
Kotoulis played in three matches for the Greece national football team in 1938. He was also part of Greece's team for their qualification matches for the 1938 FIFA World Cup.

Death
During a battle he was seriously injured in the leg, but managed to survive. He escaped the battlefront, but he didn't "escape" the center of Athens during The Occupation. Walking in April 1944 in the Pedion tou Areos and heading to his mother's house to take care of an injury from a football game, Kotoulis was arrested by the occupying forces. He was taken to the Haidari camp, where he met his brother, Vasilis, and his teammate, Kostas Christodoulou (who was tortured, but was eventually able to survive). Because two months after his arrest, in June, Kotoulis was faced with the inevitable. He was being transported with other competitors to Kaisariani to be executed. His fate was predetermined, but he tried desperately to change it. Attempting to cheat death, he jumped on the move from the truck. Unfortunately, he was too injured to escape. Beaten enough to run away. And the machine gun fire dropped him dead in the middle of the street in Metz. The story is known thanks to the AEK's masseur, Kountouris who was an eyewitness and relayed the tragic news.

Honours

AEK Athens
Panhellenic Championship: 1938–39, 1939–40
Greek Cup: 1931–32, 1938–39
Athens FCA League: 1940

References

External links

1915 births
1944 deaths
Smyrniote Greeks
Emigrants from the Ottoman Empire to Greece
Greek footballers
Greece international footballers
AEK Athens F.C. players
Association football midfielders
Footballers from İzmir